Mont Blanc is a 2001 Estonian animated film directed by Priit Tender.

Awards:
 2002: Estonian Film Journalists' Association's award: Neitsi Maali award (best film of the year)
 2002: Holland Animation Film Festival (Utrecht, Holland), AnyZone category prize
 2002: Filmfest Dresden International Short Film Festival (Germany), 2002, 2nd prize in animated film category

Plot

Cast
 Mari Mägi - women 
 Lembit Peterson - text reader
 Frank Boyle - narrator

References

External links
 
 Mont Blanc, entry in Estonian Film Database (EFIS)

2001 films
Estonian animated films